Major General Duncan Edward Lewis  (born 3 August 1953) is an Australian military officer, diplomat and intelligence chief. From 2014 to 2019, he was the Director-General of Security of the Australian Security Intelligence Organisation (ASIO). Prior to that appointment, he held the post of Australian Ambassador to the Kingdom of Belgium, the Grand Duchy of Luxembourg, the European Union and the North Atlantic Treaty Organization. He is a retired Australian Army officer, and formerly Special Operations Commander Australia (2002–2004), National Security Adviser, and Secretary of the Department of Defence.

Military career
Duncan Lewis graduated from the Royal Military College, Duntroon in 1975. Following graduation, he was assigned to the Royal Australian Infantry Corps. He holds a Bachelor of Arts degree from the University of New South Wales and a Graduate Diploma in Defence Studies and Management from Deakin University. He attended the British Army Staff College, Camberley and the US Army War College.

During his military career, Lewis served three postings with the Special Air Service Regiment, later commanding the Regiment from 1990 to 1991. For this service, Lewis was decorated with the Conspicuous Service Cross (CSC).

From 1994 to 1996, Lewis was Australian Army Attache in Jakarta, and during the INTERFET period he was appointed the Australian Defence Force (ADF) spokesman on East Timor.

Lewis was promoted to brigadier in January 2000 and appointed Commander Sector West UNTAET in East Timor, where he commanded Australian and New Zealand forces. He was awarded the Distinguished Service Cross (DSC) for his accomplishments with the unit.

Lewis assumed his appointment as Commander Special Forces in January 2001, and was promoted to the rank of major general on 19 December 2002. In the Australia Day Honours of 2005, Lewis was appointed an Officer of the Order of Australia.

Post-military career
Subsequent to his retirement from the army in 2005, Lewis joined the Australian Public Service and was appointed to the position of First Assistant Secretary of the National Security Division in the Department of the Prime Minister and Cabinet. In December 2008 he began serving as National Security Adviser to the Rudd Labor Government. On 5 August 2011 it was announced that he would be appointed the Secretary of the Australian Department of Defence, (SECDEF), effective early September. Lewis was the first former military officer to be appointed to this position.

Diplomatic career
On 17 September 2012 it was announced that Lewis had been appointed Australia's ambassador to Belgium, the European Union, Luxembourg and NATO, and would leave the Department of Defence on 10 October. While newspaper reports suggested that Lewis was unhappy with the government's cuts to defence spending, he stated that "notwithstanding media reporting, I have not been forced out of my current position and I am not departing defence for any reason other than to take up this ambassadorial posting at the request of the prime minister".

Director-General of Security
On 15 May 2014, Foreign Minister Julie Bishop and Attorney-General George Brandis issued a joint media release announcing that Lewis was to stand down as Ambassador to Belgium, the EU, Luxembourg and NATO, and would be appointed as Director-General of Security (the head of the Australian Security Intelligence Organisation, Australia's domestic intelligence agency) following the retirement of David Irvine in September 2014. In this role he was one of the architects of a new "Push Back" policy to counter Chinese influence in Australia. Lewis retired on 15 September 2019, and was replaced by Mike Burgess, the former director-general of the Australian Signals Directorate.

Honours and awards

References

External links
ADF Biography
ADF Photograph

1953 births
Australian generals
Australian military personnel of the International Force for East Timor
Directors-General of Security
Royal Military College, Duntroon graduates
Living people
Officers of the Order of Australia
Recipients of the Conspicuous Service Cross (Australia)
Recipients of the Distinguished Service Cross (Australia)
University of New South Wales alumni
Secretaries of the Australian Department of Defence
Ambassadors of Australia to Belgium
Ambassadors of Australia to the European Union
Ambassadors of Australia to Luxembourg
Ambassadors of Australia to NATO
21st-century Australian public servants